XEZV-AM (La Voz de la Montaña – "The Voice of the Mountain") is an indigenous community radio station that broadcasts in Spanish, Nahuatl, Mixtec and Tlapanec from Tlapa de Comonfort in the Mexican state of Guerrero. 
It is run by the Cultural Indigenist Broadcasting System (SRCI) of the National Commission for the Development of Indigenous Peoples (CDI). Launched on 10 May 1979, it was the first of the SRCI's radio stations in operation.

External links
XEZV website

References

Sistema de Radiodifusoras Culturales Indígenas
Radio stations in Guerrero
Mixtec
Daytime-only radio stations in Mexico
Radio stations established in 1979